Taliban: Militant Islam, Oil and Fundamentalism in Central Asia is an historical book written by Pakistani journalist Ahmed Rashid and published in 2000.

References

Further reading

External links
C-SPAN Q&A interview with Rashid about the 10th anniversary edition of Taliban, May 2, 2010

Works about the Taliban
2000 non-fiction books
Books about petroleum politics
American non-fiction books
Books about military history
British non-fiction books
Works about Afghanistan
History books about Afghanistan